Omar Bin Abul Aziz School is a private school  based in Al-Hamah near Damascus. OBAA offers education from pre-school to year 12 and follows the Syrian education system which offers a High School Diploma after finishing 12 years of education.

Summer clubs

OBAA has many activities for its student during the summer holidays which includes sports (like swimming) and volunteer initiatives amongst other leisure activities.

Sport

OBAA basketball and football teams participate in many tournaments in Syria and within the region.

References

Schools in Syria
Educational institutions established in 2003
2003 establishments in Syria